Edgar Kjerran (born 9 October 1946) is a Norwegian weightlifter. He competed in the men's heavyweight event at the 1972 Summer Olympics.

References

1946 births
Living people
Norwegian male weightlifters
Olympic weightlifters of Norway
Weightlifters at the 1972 Summer Olympics
Sportspeople from Bergen
20th-century Norwegian people